Gustatory hyperhidrosis is excessive sweating classified under focal hyperhidrosis, that is, it is restricted to certain regions of the body. Affected people regularly experience this on the forehead (scalp), upper lip, perioral region, or sternum a few moments after eating spicy foods, tomato sauce, chocolate, coffee, tea, or hot soups.
 
A common cause is trauma or damage to the nerve that passes through the parotid gland, which can be due to surgery of the parotid gland (parotidectomy). This type of sweating is known as Frey's syndrome. Gustatory hyperhidrosis has been observed in diabetics with autonomic neuropathy, and a variant of this disorder has been reported following surgical sympathectomy. 

Around 10% of affected people require treatment. One of the more effective treatments is oral or topically applied glycopyrrolate.

References

Conditions of the skin appendages